Viliame Veikoso (born 4 April 1982 in Suva, Fiji) is a Fijian rugby union footballer.  He plays as a hooker. Veikoso hails from Nabua village, tikina Koroalau from Cakaudrove Province. he is also related to Akapusi Qera of Gloucester. Veikoso resides with his parents at Kinoya whose father is also a former school teacher.
They currently live beside former Australian Wallaby international and ex Fiji coach Ilivasi Tabua.

Veikoso was also a former member of the QVS Old Boys Club which regularly play at the Suva Rugby Competition. He is regular for the Nadi's on the provincial competition in Fiji.
Before playing for Fiji Veikoso played for 2nd division New Zealand side North Otago with whom he won the Heartland Championship in 2005 and 2006.

See also
Fiji national rugby union team
Fiji Warriors
2009 end of year rugby tests

External links
 Fiji Rugby profile

1982 births
Living people
Rugby union hookers
Fijian rugby union players
Fiji international rugby union players
North Otago rugby union players
Doncaster Knights players
Fijian expatriate rugby union players
Expatriate rugby union players in New Zealand
Fijian expatriate sportspeople in New Zealand
Sportspeople from Suva
I-Taukei Fijian people